Moira railway station serves Moira in County Down, Northern Ireland. Despite the station serving the County Down town, the station itself is located in County Antrim, the neighbouring Lagan Canal being the boundary. Moira station is the oldest building on the NI Railways network today having been opened on 18 November 1841. The old, now redundant, signal box stands over the station on the Southbound side.

Situated near the M1 motorway, the station is popular amongst commuters from the surrounding area.

In March 2014, NIR started construction of a new footbridge at the Portadown end of the station. The footbridge was completed in August 2014.

Station Buildings
There is a station building and signal cabin on the 'down' platform.  Off site, away from the platforms, there is a station master's house. NIR have included in their corporate plans for a new footbridge to be constructed at Moira. The signal cabin was recently repainted. During the construction of the station and the railway thousands of skeletons were unearthed, leading to a greater understanding of the Battle of Moira, the largest battle in the history of Ireland, which had occurred in 637 and the previous details of which were much less well known.

Lines in the Past
The Ulster Railway brought trains from Belfast Great Victoria Street railway station to Portadown and Armagh railway station in Armagh.  Later the Great Northern Railway of Ireland had a much more extensive system with trains to Omagh, Enniskillen, Bundoran, Strabane and Derry/Londonderry being linked, which in the 1950s and 1960s was closed west of Portadown.

Lines in the Present
The station is now part of NIR's Newry-Bangor service.

Service

Extra trains operate at peak times, and the service reduces to hourly operation in the evenings.

Although on the Belfast-Dublin line, Enterprise services do not call at Moira station.

On Sundays, the service is hourly in each direction.

Future Link to Armagh City
There is a possible future railway reopening from Portadown railway station to Armagh.

References 

Railway stations in County Antrim
Railway stations served by NI Railways
Railway stations in Northern Ireland opened in 1841